Vetulicolidae is an extinct family of Early Cambrian deuterostomes comprising two genera: Vetulicola and Ooedigera.

References

Vetulicolia